In music theory, the flamenco mode (also Major-Phrygian) is a harmonized mode or scale abstracted from its use in flamenco music. In other words, it is the collection of pitches in ascending order accompanied by chords representing the pitches and chords used together in flamenco songs and pieces. The key signature is the same as that of the Phrygian mode (on E: no accidentals; on C: four flats), with the raised third and seventh being written in as necessary with accidentals. Its modal/tonal characteristics are prominent in the Andalusian cadence.

The exact chords depend on the song form (palo) and guitar chord positions since chord voicings in flamenco often include nontriadic pitches, especially open strings. It is characteristic that III, II, and I appear as dissonant chords with a minimum of four tones (for example seventh chords or mixed third chord). Since the tetrachord beginning on the tonic may ascend or descend with either G-sharp or natural (Phrygian tetrachord), the mixed-thirds clash between the major third degree (G) in the melody and the minor third degree (G) in the accompanying harmony occurs frequently and is characteristic of the flamenco esthetic, as with the blues scale on a major chord.

This tetrachord may be copied in the second, producing a D and allowing an augmented sixth chord on the second degree: B75/F.

Lou Harrison composed a "Sonata in Ishartum" (1974 or 1977), which has been arranged by Tolgahan Çoğulu (2001), part of his Suite. In early scholarship regarding a Babylonian cuneiform inscription tuning tablet from the eighteenth century BC, "Ishartum" was equated with the modern Phrygian, but now it isconsidered equivalent to the Ionian mode/major scale. Çoğulu's arrangement, at least, is the white note mode on E in Pythagorean tuning, as follows: F, C, G, D, A, E, B (F, C, G), or E (1/1), F (256/243), G (32/27), A (4/3), B (3/2), C (128/81), D (16/9), E (2/1), with G being 81/64.

See also
Phrygian dominant scale
Upper leading tone
Double harmonic scale

References

Flamenco
Modes (music)
Heptatonic scales
Tritonic scales